Michael David Evans (born June 30, 1947) is an American author, journalist, and commentator. 
Evans has written books and has provided analysis and commentary on Middle East affairs. He founded and serves as the head of many politically conservative Christian organizations.

Early life
Evans was born in Springfield, Massachusetts, on June 30, 1947, to a non-practicing Jewish mother whose parents were immigrants from the Soviet Union. His father was a violent alcoholic and wife beater. At age 11, Evans objected to his father beating his mother, and was assaulted; when he recovered, he had what he describes as a dramatic encounter with Jesus Christ, who promised him a future.

Career

Ten Boom Fellowship 
Mike Evans purchased and restored the Corrie ten Boom house in 1983. It is a museum dedicated to telling the story of ten Boom's family, which harbored, fed, and found safe houses for as many as 800 Jews during the Nazi takeover of the Netherlands during World War II. After purchasing and restoring the house, Mike Evans created the Corrie ten Boom Fellowship, a Christian Zionist organization.

Friends of Zion Heritage Center 
In 2015, Evans founded the Friends of Zion Heritage Center in Jerusalem with the purpose of highlighting religious tolerance and dialogue between Christian Zionism and the State of Israel and the Jewish people. Israel's ninth president, Shimon Peres, was the international chairman of Friends of Zion and the founder of the Friends of Zion Award to honor outstanding support for Israel.

Jerusalem Prayer Team 

Mike Evans began the Jerusalem Prayer Team in 2002, which raised money for Ehud Olmert's New Jerusalem Foundation. The Jerusalem Prayer Team funded the construction of the Mike Evans Museum in Jerusalem, officially known as The Friends of Zion Heritage Center. Evans was accused of being a Christian missionary due to his history. In 1977, he headed B'nai Yeshua, a "Hebrew Christian" group, which was active on college campuses. A campaign accusing him of subterfuge in Long Island resulted in media coverage. Articles simultaneously praise him for his pro-Israel activism, but warn of a possible hidden agenda to convert Jews in Israel to Christianity or "Hebrew Christian" beliefs.

Relationship with Benjamin Netanyahu
Evans has known Israeli Prime Minister Benjamin Netanyahu since the early 1980s. In June 2021, Benjamin Netanyahu was replaced as Prime Minister by Naftali Bennett of the Yamina party. The following month, Evans told a press conference at a Jerusalem hotel: "Bibi Netanyahu is the only man in the world who unites evangelicals." In a blog post for The Times of Israel, he also compared members of the parties that comprised the unity government to "rabid dogs" who wish to "crucify" Netanyahu. This public attack on the new government dented Evans' reputation and influence in Israel. Danny Ayalon, a former Israeli ambassador to the U.S., told Foreign Policy, "[Evans] may be a friend of Bibi Netanyahu, but it did not give him the right to do what he did."

Author 
Evans has written on the Middle East, Christian living, prophecy, and Iraq. His works include 42 fiction and non-fiction books, many self-published. Those that made The New York Times Best Seller list are The Final Move Beyond Iraq: The Final Solution While the World Sleeps, The American Prophecies, and Showdown with Nuclear Iran. More recent books include See You in New York, Finding Favor with Man, The Volunteers, History of Christian Zionism (2 vol. set), Christopher Columbus, Betsie, Promise of God, and Countdown.

Evans' book Israel: America's Key to Survival was endorsed by Prime Minister Menachem Begin.

Honors 
 In 2006, Evans was granted an Honorary Doctor of Political Science by Grand Canyon University in Phoenix, Arizona.

References

External links 
 
 The Bridge Builder
 Friends of Zion Museum

1947 births
Living people
20th-century American male writers
20th-century American non-fiction writers
20th-century evangelicals
21st-century American male writers
21st-century American non-fiction writers
21st-century evangelicals
American Christian Zionists
American male journalists
American male non-fiction writers
American people of Jewish descent
Christian novelists
Evangelical writers
Writers from Springfield, Massachusetts
Writers on the Middle East
Writers on Zionism